The 2011–12 Hellenic Football League season was the 59th in the history of the Hellenic Football League, a football competition in England.

Premier Division

Premier Division featured 18 clubs which competed in the division last season, along with four new clubs:
Bicester Town, promoted from Division One West
Cheltenham Saracens, promoted from Division One West
Henley Town, promoted from Division One East
Holyport, promoted from Division One East

Also, Witney United changed name to Witney Town.

Though Bicester Town were promoted to the Premier Division they never started the season and were expelled from the league.

League table

Division One East

Division One East featured ten clubs which competed in the division last season, along with six new clubs:
Abingdon United reserves, promoted from Reserve Division One
Highmoor Ibis, joined from the Reading League
Lambourn Sports, joined from the North Berks League
Letcombe, transferred from Division One West
Maidenhead United reserves, promoted from Reserve Division One
Thatcham Town reserves, promoted from Reserve Division One

League table

Division One West

Division One West featured eleven clubs which competed in the division last season, along with six new clubs:
Brimscombe & Thrupp, joined from the Gloucestershire County League
Carterton, relegated from the Premier Division
Cirencester Town development, promoted from Reserve Division One
New College Swindon, joined from the Wiltshire League
Old Woodstock Town, relegated from the Premier Division
Wootton Bassett Town, relegated from the Premier Division

League table

Division Two East

Division Two East featured 14 new clubs.

League table

Division Two West

Division Two West featured 14 new clubs.

League table

References

External links
 Hellenic Football League

2011-12
9